Chocaya Canton is one of the cantons of the Atocha Municipality, the second municipal section of the Sud Chichas Province in the Potosí Department in south-west Bolivia. Its seat is Chocaya.

References 

 www.ine.gov.bo

External links
 Atocha Municipality: population data and map (PDF; 625 kB)

Cantons of Potosí Department
Cantons of Bolivia